BAR Aviation Uganda , is an air services company offering five distinctive services in Uganda, namely: (a) airline charter services (b) pilot training (c) medical evacuation flights (d) scheduled airline flights to domestic destinations and (e) aircraft maintenance services. Its main base is Entebbe International Airport. The company also maintains a second hub at Kajjansi Airport, in Wakiso District, off of the Kampala-Entebbe Road, in the Central Region of the country.

Destinations
According to its website, as of March 2022, BAR Aviation operates regular scheduled airline services to the following destinations:

Fleet 
As of March 2022, the BAR Aviation fleet includes the following aircraft:

History
BAR Aviation was established in Uganda in 2008. It began with pilot training, air charter services and aircraft maintenance services. The airline began scheduled flight services in Uganda on 1 February 2022. BAR Aviation Uganda utilizes the AeroCRS Cloud Reservation System.

The airline expects to participate in the revival of the tourism sector, following devastation by the COVID-19 pandemic. In addition, with the ongoing expansion of the country's petrochemical industry, a number of aircraft acquisitions are targeted towards medical evacuation activities.

BAR Aviation Uganda has an interline agreement with Uganda Airlines, on domestic travel, within Uganda.

See also
 List of airlines of Uganda

References

External links
Website of BAR Aviation Uganda

Airlines of Uganda
Airlines established in 2008
2008 establishments in Uganda
Organisations based in Entebbe